Bagan is a federal constituency in North Seberang Perai District, Penang, Malaysia, that has been represented in the Dewan Rakyat since 1959.

The federal constituency was created in the 1958 redistribution and is mandated to return a single member to the Dewan Rakyat under the first past the post voting system.

Demographics 
https://live.chinapress.com.my/ge15/parliament/PENANG

History
It was abolished in 1974 when it was redistributed. It was re-created in 1984.

Polling districts 
According to the federal gazette issued on 31 October 2022, the Bagan constituency is divided into 24 polling districts.

Representation history

State constituency

Current state assembly members

Local governments

Election results

References

Penang federal constituencies